Tanganika-Moero District was a district of the Belgian Congo from 1912 to 1933, when it was dissolved.
It roughly corresponded to the present Tanganyika Province and the northern part of Haut-Katanga Province.

Location

Parts of the Stanley Falls and Lualaba districts were combined to form Katanga in 1910, which was called a vice-government general.
An arrêté royal of 28 March 1912 divided the Congo into 22 districts.
A map of the colony after this division shows Tanganika-Moero District bordered by British territories and Lake Tanganyika to the east, Kivu and Maniema districts to the north, Lomami and Lulua districts to the west and Haut-Luapula District to the south.
The district was named after Lake Tanganyika and Lake Mweru, which bordered the district to the east and south respectively.

Katanga become a vice-government in 1913.
It contained the districts of Lomami, Tanganika-Moero, Lulua and Haut-Luapula.
In 1933 the provinces were reorganized into six provinces, named after their capitals, and the central government assumed more control.
Katanga became Elisabethville Province.
The number of districts in the colony was reduced to 15, with 102 territories.
The northern part of Tanganika-Moero became Tanganika District, while the southern part was absorbed by Haut-Katanga District.

On 11 July 1960, a few days after the Congo Republic had gained independence, the province of Katanga seceded as an independent state.
In November 1961 the northern portion was reconquered by the national government and made the province of Nord-Katanga.
On 21 January 1963 the remainder of Katanga was reconquered and divided into the provinces of Lualaba and Katanga Oriental.
Nord-Katanga, Lualaba and Katanga Oriental were merged back into the province of Katanga on 28 December 1966. 
In 2015 Tanganyika Province was formed from the Tanganyika district, whose town of Kalemie was elevated to capital city of the new province.

Maps

See also
Districts of the Belgian Congo

References

Sources

Districts of the Belgian Congo
Districts of Katanga Province